Raffaele Giammaria (born 1 September 1977 in Civitavecchia) is an Italian racing car driver.

He was runner-up in the Formula Renault 2000 Italy series in 2000, then progressed through German and Italian Formula Three and Italian Formula 3000 to International Formula 3000 for 2003 with the Durango team. He scored one podium and was placed tenth in the championship with 12 points, a respectable score in his début season.

2004 was even better for Giammaria, with 27 points scored and eighth place in the championship secured by the season's end.  However, he missed one of the races due to financial problems, and was forced to switch teams, from Durango to Astromega.

It was therefore not much of a surprise when he failed to get a drive in the rebranded GP2 Series for 2005.  He competed in Formula Renault 3.5 Series and Italian F3000 instead, but only in part-time roles.  He was also part of A1 Team Italy for the inaugural season of the A1 Grand Prix series, but never drove the car.

He competed in Italian GT racing for 2006.

Racing record

Complete International Formula 3000 results
(key) (Races in bold indicate pole position; races in italics indicate fastest lap.)

Complete Formula Renault 3.5 Series results 
(key) (Races in bold indicate pole position) (Races in italics indicate fastest lap)

Complete 24 Hours of Le Mans results

External links
 

1977 births
Living people
Italian racing drivers
24 Hours of Le Mans drivers
Auto GP drivers
Italian Formula Renault 2.0 drivers
Italian Formula Three Championship drivers
German Formula Three Championship drivers
International Formula 3000 drivers
European Le Mans Series drivers
World Series Formula V8 3.5 drivers
Superstars Series drivers
People from Civitavecchia
Blancpain Endurance Series drivers
International GT Open drivers
24 Hours of Spa drivers
FIA GT Championship drivers
Rolex Sports Car Series drivers
FIA World Endurance Championship drivers
WeatherTech SportsCar Championship drivers
Sportspeople from the Metropolitan City of Rome Capital

Team Astromega drivers
Durango drivers
DAMS drivers
AF Corse drivers
Target Racing drivers
Cram Competition drivers
Euronova Racing drivers
Scuderia Coloni drivers
Iron Lynx drivers